Maung Maung Ohn is the current union minister for Information of Myanmar.He has served as the union minister of Hotels and Tourism from February 2021 to August 2021 and Chief Minister of Rakhine State, Myanmar from 2014 to 2016. He is a Myanmar Army general and former Deputy Minister of Home Affairs.

He replaced Hla Maung Tin, whose resignation was announced by Burmese state-run newspapers on 20 June 2014. Maung Maung Ohn is an ethnic Burman, despite demands from the Rakhine National Party that the post be held by an ethnic Rakhine who is also an elected member of parliament and party member. Maung Maung Ohn was nominated by President Thein Sein for the post, and confirmed by the Rakhine State Hluttaw on 30 June.

References

Government ministers of Myanmar
Information ministers of Myanmar
Burmese military personnel
Year of birth missing (living people)
Place of birth missing (living people)
Living people